Players and pairs who neither have high enough rankings nor receive wild cards may participate in a qualifying tournament held one week before the annual Wimbledon Tennis Championships.

Seeds

  Lukáš Rosol (first round)
  Łukasz Kubot (qualified)
  Rui Machado (first round)
  Thomas Schoorel (second round)
  Tatsuma Ito (first round)
  Steve Darcis (second round, retired)
  Dustin Brown (first round)
  Marsel İlhan (first round)
  Flavio Cipolla (qualified)
  Stéphane Robert (first round)
  Paolo Lorenzi (first round)
  Marc Gicquel (qualifying competition, lucky loser)
  Simone Bolelli (qualifying competition, lucky loser)
  Ryan Harrison (qualifying competition, lucky loser)
  Ivo Minář (second round)
  Go Soeda (qualifying competition, lucky loser)
  Karol Beck (qualified)
  Izak van der Merwe (first round)
  Daniel Brands (first round)
  Lukáš Lacko (qualified)
  Rogério Dutra da Silva (second round)
  Stéphane Bohli (first round)
  Simon Greul (first round)
  Bobby Reynolds (first round)
  Andreas Beck (qualified)
  Martin Kližan (first round, retired)
  Martin Fischer (qualified)
  Alexandre Kudryavtsev (second round)
  Édouard Roger-Vasselin (qualified)
  Marinko Matosevic (qualified)
  Alessio di Mauro (first round)
  Rik de Voest (qualified)

Qualifiers

  Igor Sijsling
  Łukasz Kubot
  Bernard Tomic
  Marinko Matosevic
  Andreas Beck
  Karol Beck
  Rik de Voest
  Martin Fischer
  Flavio Cipolla
  Frank Dancevic
  Conor Niland
  Édouard Roger-Vasselin
  Kenny de Schepper
  Cedrik-Marcel Stebe
  Ruben Bemelmans
  Lukáš Lacko

Lucky losers

  Marc Gicquel
  Simone Bolelli
  Ryan Harrison
  Go Soeda
  Grega Žemlja

Qualifying draw

First qualifier

Second qualifier

Third qualifier

Fourth qualifier

Fifth qualifier

Sixth qualifier

Seventh qualifier

Eighth qualifier

Ninth qualifier

Tenth qualifier

Eleventh qualifier

Twelfth qualifier

Thirteenth qualifier

Fourteenth qualifier

Fifteenth qualifier

Sixteenth qualifier

External links

 2011 Wimbledon Championships – Men's draws and results at the International Tennis Federation

Men's Singles Qualifying
Wimbledon Championship by year – Men's singles qualifying